Elfie Pertramer (1924–2011) was a German stage and film actress. Born in Munich, she appeared in a number of films, particularly comedies, with a Bavarian theme.

Selected filmography
 Two in One Suit (1950)
 Trouble in Paradise (1950)
 The Exchange (1952)
 The Crucifix Carver of Ammergau (1952)
 Two People (1952)
 Marriage Strike (1953)
 The Big Star Parade (1954)
 Three Days Confined to Barracks (1955)
 Urlaub auf Ehrenwort (1955)
 When the Alpine Roses Bloom  (1955)
 Yes, Yes, Love in Tyrol (1955)
 Where the Ancient Forests Rustle (1956)
 Two Bavarians in the Harem (1957)
 Hula-Hopp, Conny (1959)
 Max the Pickpocket (1962)
 When You're With Me (1970)
 Einer spinnt immer (1971)
 Onkel Filser – Allerneueste Lausbubengeschichten (1966)
 Schwarzwaldfahrt aus Liebeskummer (1974)

References

Bibliography
 Willi Höfig. Der deutsche Heimatfilm 1947-1960. 1973.

External links

1924 births
2011 deaths
German film actresses
Actresses from Munich
Bayerischer Rundfunk people